Mostafa Smaili (born 9 January 1997) is a Moroccan middle-distance runner. He competed in the 800 metres at the 2016 IAAF World Indoor Championships. At the 2020 Summer Olympics, he competed in the men's 800 metres event.

Competition record

Personal bests
Outdoor 
400 metres - 47'70 (Fes 2016)
800 metres – 1:44.90 (Zagreb 2018)
1500 metres – 3:38.60 (Belfort 2017)
3000 metres – 8:36.35 (Fès 2013)

Indoor
800 metres – 1:45.96 (Gent 2018)

References

External links
 
 
 
 

1997 births
Living people
Moroccan male middle-distance runners
Place of birth missing (living people)
Athletes (track and field) at the 2014 Summer Youth Olympics
Athletes (track and field) at the 2016 Summer Olympics
Olympic athletes of Morocco
World Athletics Championships athletes for Morocco
Mediterranean Games silver medalists for Morocco
Mediterranean Games medalists in athletics
Athletes (track and field) at the 2018 Mediterranean Games
Athletes (track and field) at the 2022 Mediterranean Games
Athletes (track and field) at the 2019 African Games
African Games competitors for Morocco
Islamic Solidarity Games competitors for Morocco
Islamic Solidarity Games medalists in athletics
Athletes (track and field) at the 2020 Summer Olympics